was a Japanese film director.

Biography
Born in Shiga Prefecture, he joined the Shōchiku studio in 1929. He debuted as director in 1934, but continued working as an assistant director for such filmmakers as Yasujirō Ozu and Yasujirō Shimazu after that. It was the 1939 film Warm Current that established his status as a director. During the Sino-Japanese war he directed a number of military dramas such as The Legend of Tank Commander Nishizumi (1940), for which he toured the actual battlefields in China. His 1947 work The Ball at the Anjo House, starring Setsuko Hara, was named the best picture of the year by Kinema Junpo. This film marked the start of a long relationship with the screenwriter and film director Kaneto Shindō. In 1950, the two of them started the independent production company Kindai Eiga Kyokai. 

Yoshimura is credited with furthering the careers of such actresses as Fujiko Yamamoto, Machiko Kyō and Ayako Wakao. He directed over 60 films during his career, and received a Medal of Honor (Purple Ribbon) from the Japanese government in 1976.

Selected filmography
 Warm Current (暖流, Danryū) (1939)
 The Legend of Tank Commander Nishizumi (1940)
 The Spy isn't Dead Yet (1942)
 The Ball at the Anjo House (安城家の舞踏会, Anjō-ke no butōkai) (1947)
 The Tale of Genji (1951)
 Before the Dawn (1953)
 Epitome (1953) (producer only)
 Life of a Woman (1953) (producer only)
 Ginza no onna (1955)
 Night River (1956)
 An Osaka Story (1957)
 A Woman's Uphill Slope (女の坂, Onna no saka) (1960)
 A Woman's Testament (女経, Jokyō) (1960) (episode "The Woman Who Forgot to Love")

References

External links
 
 

1911 births
2000 deaths
Japanese film directors
People from Ōtsu, Shiga